Live Line is double live album by Australian hard rock band The Angels originally released in December 1987. It reached No. 3 in Australia and No.14 in New Zealand.

Description
The collection spanned ten years of the band's career. The majority of the album was recorded at the Bankstown RSL Club in Sydney, with some tracks taken from earlier tours featuring John Brewster. A live version of "Am I Ever Gonna See Your Face Again" was issued as a single, as was a medley of "Love Takes Care" and "Be with You". Following the success of the album, The Angels embarked on a massive tour of Australia with a lengthy three-hour show, with three sets chronologically spanning a significant portion of the band's history. The remastered CD version was released on 8 February 1999 by Shock Records as a double live album and included several songs not included on the vinyl release.

Reception
Smash Hits said, "It could hardly fail with half the songs being basically the band's greatest hits with a whole heap of lesser known but equally excellent tracks that drive audiences wild across the nation. The recording quality is impeccable."

Track listings
Disc 1
"Comin' Down"  – 4:28
"No Secrets"  – 4:42
"Did You Hurt Somebody"  – 3:26
"Standing over You"  – 3:01
"Shadow Boxer"  – 2:41
"After the Rain"  – 5:07
"Small Price"  – 4:47
"Fashion and Fame"  – 4:49
"Love Takes Care"  – 4:39
"Be with You"  – 4:07
"Run for the Shelter"  – 3:59
"Save Me"  – 4:23
"Underground"  – 6:58

Disc 2
 "Back on You"  – 4:12
 "Am I Ever Gonna See Your Face Again"  – 3:15
 "Stand Up"  – 4:10
 "Don't Waste My Time"  – 5:17
 "Face the Day"  – 3:28
 "City Out of Control"  – 9:53
 "Eat City"  – 5:03
 "Small Talk"  – 3:25
 "Take a Long Line"  – 5:24
 "Mr. Damage"  – 4:28
 "Marseilles"  – 10:16

Remastered CD edition

Disc 1
"Comin' Down" – 4:28
"No Secrets" – 4:42
"Did You Hurt Somebody" – 3:26
"Standing over You" – 3:01
"Shadow Boxer" – 2:41
"After the Rain" – 5:07
"Small Price" – 4:47
"Fashion and Fame" – 4:49
"Love Takes Care" – 4:39
"Be with You" – 4:07
"Run for the Shelter" – 3:59
"Save Me" – 4:23
"Underground" – 6:58
"Back on You" – 4:12
"Am I Ever Gonna See Your Face Again" – 3:15
"Stand Up" – 4:10
"Don't Waste My time" – 5:17
"Face the Day" – 3:28

Disc 2
 "City Out of Control" – 9:53
 "Eat City" – 5:03
 "Small Talk" – 3:25
 "Take a Long Line" – 5:24
 "Mr. Damage" – 4:28
 "Marseilles" – 10:16
 "Nothin to Win" – 5:14
 "Night Comes Early" – 3:59
 "Into the Heat" – 3:16
 "Long Night" – 4:17
 "Easy Prey" – 3:22
 "Is That You?" – 3:48
 "No Sleep in Hell" – 5:25
 "Talk About You" – 3:46
 "Gonna Leave You" – 3:04
 "I Ain't the One" – 2:56

Personnel
The Angels
 Doc Neeson – lead vocals, acoustic guitar
 Rick Brewster – lead guitar, acoustic guitar
 John Brewster – rhythm guitar, backing vocals (1981-1983 recordings) 	
 Bob Spencer – rhythm guitar, acoustic guitar, backing vocals
 Jim Hilbun – bass guitar, lead vocals on "Back on You", backing vocals, saxophone
 Brent Eccles – drums, tambourine

Production
Andrew Scott, Howard Page, Ross Cockle – live recordings engineers
Bill Price – mixing

Charts

Weekly charts

Year-end charts

References 

The Angels (Australian band) albums
1987 live albums
Mushroom Records live albums